PAGEOS (PAssive Geodetic Earth Orbiting Satellite) was a balloon satellite which was launched by NASA in June 1966.

Design

Finished in 1974, the network connected 46 stations (3000–5000 km distance) of all continents with an accuracy of 3–5 m (approx. 20 times better than terrestrial triangulations at that time).

Orbit
The PAGEOS spacecraft was placed into a polar orbit (inclination 85–86°) with a height of approx. 4000 km, which had gradually lowered during its 9 years of operation. The satellite partly disintegrated in July 1975, which was followed by a second break-up that occurred in January 1976 resulting in the release of a large number of fragments. Most of these re-entered during the following decade. PAGEOS  data have been released in 11 data sets.

PAGEOS' predecessors in satellite triangulation were the balloons Echo 1 (1960, 30 m) and Echo 2 (1964, 40 m) which were also used for passive telecommunication. Their apparent magnitude (brightness) was 1 mag, that of Pageos 2 mag (like Polaris) due to its higher orbit. Pageos could therefore be observed simultaneously e.g. from the ground in places such as Europe and North America. PAGEOS appeared as a slow-moving star (at first glance it would appear to be stationary). Its orbital period was approximately three hours. Because of its high orbit and polar inclination it would avoid the Earth's shadow and be observed any time of the night (low-orbit satellites are only observable shortly after sunset and before sunrise). In the early 1970s PAGEOS varied from 2nd apparent magnitude to beyond visibility over a period of a few minutes.

In 2016, one of the largest fragments of PAGEOS de-orbited.

See also

 List of passive satellites
 Reference ellipsoid
 World Geodetic System (WGS84)

References

External links
 NASA technical note: The fabrication and testing of PAGEOS I

Geodesy
Satellites formerly orbiting Earth
Passive satellites
Spacecraft launched in 1966
Balloon satellites